The Luzon fanged frog (Limnonectes macrocephalus) is a species of frog in the family Dicroglossidae.
It is endemic to the Philippines.

Its natural habitats are subtropical or tropical moist lowland forest, subtropical or tropical moist montane forest, rivers, intermittent rivers, freshwater marshes, intermittent freshwater marshes, coastal freshwater lagoons, arable land, pastureland, and plantations .
It is becoming rare due to habitat loss.

References

Limnonectes
Amphibians of the Philippines
Endemic fauna of the Philippines
Fauna of Luzon
Taxonomy articles created by Polbot
Amphibians described in 1954